Brainerd Dam is a dam across the Mississippi River in the city of Brainerd, Minnesota, United States. It forms the back-waters known as Rice Lake.

In June 2014, the city of Brainerd purchased the dam formerly operated by Wausau Paper.

Location:	                River Mile 1003.7
County:	                Crow Wing
Structure type:	        Concrete structure
Structure width:	        451 feet (estimated)
River elevation (pool):	1,174 feet
River elevation (outflow):	1,152 feet
Water fall:	                22 feet
Date built:	                1888

References 

Buildings and structures in Crow Wing County, Minnesota
Dams in Minnesota
Dams on the Mississippi River
Dams completed in 1888
United States privately owned dams